Cady Lake is a lake in South Dakota, in the United States. 
 
Cady Lake has the name of A. D. Cady, a pioneer who settled there.

See also
List of lakes in South Dakota

References

Lakes of South Dakota
Bodies of water of Jerauld County, South Dakota